Adrián Arturo Diz Pe (born 4 March 1994) is a Cuban professional footballer who plays as a defender for USL Championship club Indy Eleven.

Club career
A tall central defender, he played for local teams Las Tunas and Ciudad de la Habana. After a friendly match in Cuba, Mexican side Santos Laguna agreed to sign four Cuban players for the 2016 Apertura season, with Diz being one of them. He however had reportedly disappeared in February 2016.

On 17 March 2021, Diz joined USL Championship side Rio Grande Valley FC.

Diz signed with USL Championship club FC Tulsa on 26 January 2022.

Diz was transferred to Indy Eleven on March 1, 2023. The terms and the transfer fee were not disclosed.

International career
Diz has played in London 2012 Olympic qualifying tournament, 2011 Pan American Games, 2011 CONCACAF U-17 Championship, 2013 CONCACAF U-20 Championship, 2013 FIFA U-20 World Cup, 2012 Caribbean Cup and the 2014 Central American and Caribbean Games.

He made his international debut for Cuba in a June 2012 FIFA World Cup qualification match against Panama and has earned a total of 13 caps, scoring no goals. He represented his country in three FIFA World Cup qualifying matches, and played at five CONCACAF Gold Cup final tournaments.

References

External links
 

1993 births
Living people
Sportspeople from Havana
Association football central defenders
Cuban footballers
Cuba international footballers
Cuba youth international footballers
2015 CONCACAF Gold Cup players
Competitors at the 2014 Central American and Caribbean Games
Central American and Caribbean Games bronze medalists for Cuba
Footballers at the 2011 Pan American Games
Pan American Games competitors for Cuba
FC Las Tunas players
FC Ciudad de La Habana players
Santos Laguna footballers
Cuban expatriate footballers
Expatriate footballers in Mexico
Cuban expatriate sportspeople in Mexico
Portland Timbers 2 players
USL Championship players
Central American and Caribbean Games medalists in football
Colorado Springs Switchbacks FC players
Rio Grande Valley FC Toros players
FC Tulsa players
Indy Eleven players